Jobke Pieter Hendrik Heiblom (born 27 April 1991), better known by his stage name Jay Hardway (stylised as JΔY HΔRDWΔY), is a Dutch DJ, record producer and electronic musician from Drunen, North Brabant. He is signed to Spinnin' Records. He is best known for his collaboration "Wizard" in conjunction with his fellow Dutch artist Martin Garrix. The 2013 single became an international hit charting in Belgium, France and the Netherlands.

Career

2012–present: Breakthrough and singles
Hardway's first collaboration with Martin Garrix "Registration Code" was released in 2012 as a free download through SoundCloud. In March 2013, the two released the single "Error 404" through Doorn Records. In December 2013, Hardway and Garrix released the single "Wizard" through Spinnin' Records, which became one of their most successful collaborations to date. The song peaked at number 16 on the Dutch Singles Chart and number 7 on the UK Singles Chart. Hardway released his first solo single "Bootcamp" on 31 May 2014. His song "Freedom" with Mike Hawkins was later released in August of the same year. Later on 13 November 2015, he released "Electric Elephants" on Spinnin' Records. On 17 October 2016, he collaborated with fellow Dutch DJ Martin Garrix on "Spotless".

Discography

Singles

Remixes

Awards and nominations

DJ Magazine top 100 DJs

References

External links
Official website

1991 births
Living people
Dutch dance musicians
Dutch DJs
Spinnin' Records artists
People from Heusden
Progressive house musicians
Electronic dance music DJs
Armada Music artists
Revealed Recordings artists
Stmpd Rcrds artists